The Maturin Ponds Formation is a formation cropping out in Newfoundland, comprising red arkose sandstones and siltstones.

References

Ediacaran Newfoundland and Labrador